Banter is a radio programme that is broadcast on BBC Radio 4 in the United Kingdom, starring Andrew Collins and Richard Herring. The pilot and the first 2 series were broadcast from August 2005 to November 2006, and a third series was broadcast in April and May 2008. There have been 19 half-hour episodes so far. The programme normally takes the form of invited guests naming their "top threes" in a given category.

The series was devised by Tim Barber and is produced for Radio 4 by Avalon. A pilot for a television version under the name of "Rule Of 3" was recorded in October 2011 with Rebecca Front as host and team captains Russell Howard and Chris Addison.

Guests
Apart from Collins and Herring, the other guests for each episode were:

Pilot - Lucy Porter, Russell Howard, Will Smith.

Series 1
Episode 1 - Will Smith, Russell Howard, Jenny Eclair
Episode 2 - Will Smith, Simon Day, Lynn Ferguson
Episode 3 - Russell Howard, Arthur Smith, Natalie Haynes
Episode 4 - Russell Howard, Sue Perkins, Chris Addison
Episode 5 - Will Smith, Lynn Ferguson, Dave Gorman
Episode 6 - Will Smith, Russell Howard, Jenny Éclair

Series 2
Episode 1 - Russell Howard, Lucy Porter, Arthur Smith
Episode 2 - Rob Deering, Lynn Ferguson, Russell Howard
Episode 3 - Barry Cryer, Sue Perkins, Will Smith
Episode 4 - Russell Howard, Lee Mack, Julia Morris
Episode 5 - Chris Addison, Natalie Haynes, Will Smith
Episode 6 - Russell Howard, Will Smith, Lynn Ferguson

Series 3
Episode 1 - Dave Gorman, Russell Howard, Dillie Keane
Episode 2 - Jenny Eclair, Russell Howard, Arthur Smith
Episode 3 - Natalie Haynes, Russell Howard, Will Smith
Episode 4 - Miranda Hart, Russell Howard, Will Smith
Episode 5 - Chris Addison, Jenny Eclair, Will Smith
Episode 6 - Lynn Ferguson, Tim Vine, Will Smith

Notes and references 
 Lavalie, John. "Banter" EpGuides, 29 Jul 2005
 Herring, Richard. September News

External links
 

BBC Radio 4 programmes
BBC Radio comedy programmes